This is a list of all the United States Supreme Court cases from volume 375 of the United States Reports:

External links

1963 in United States case law
1964 in United States case law